Joost van Leijen (born 20 July 1984) is a Dutch former professional road cyclist, who competed as a professional between 2010 and 2013.

Palmarès

2005
 5th GP Herning
2007
 1st Overall Tour de Slovaquie
1st Stage 3
2008
 2nd Overall Tour de Hokkaido
1st Stage 4
 5th Grote Prijs Jef Scherens
2009
 2nd Overall Olympia's Tour
 2nd Ringerike GP
2010
 1st Münsterland Giro
 3rd GP Herning
 8th Ronde van Noord-Holland
 10th Overall Danmark Rundt
2011
 2nd Overall Tour de Wallonie
1st Stage 2
 4th Overall Ster ZLM Toer
 6th Overall Eneco Tour
 8th Overall Tour of Belgium

References

External links

Joost van Leijen profile at Vacansoleil-DCM

1984 births
Living people
Dutch male cyclists
Sportspeople from Nijmegen
Cyclists from Gelderland
20th-century Dutch people
21st-century Dutch people